The 1973–74 Lancashire Cup was the sixty-first occasion of the Lancashire Cup. Wigan won the trophy  by beating Salford by the score of 19–9 in the final. The match was played at Wilderspool, Warrington. The attendance was 8,012 and receipts were £2,750.

Background 
The total number of teams entering the competition remained at last season’s total of 14 with  no junior/amateur clubs taking part.
The same fixture format was retained, but due to the decrease in the number of participating clubs, resulted in one  "blank" or "dummy" fixtures in the first round, and one bye in the second round.

Competition and results

Round 1 
Involved  7 matches (with one "blank" fixture) and 14 clubs

Round 2 - Quarter-finals 
Involved 3 matches (with one bye) and 7 clubs

Round 3 – Semi-finals  
Involved 2 matches and 4 clubs

Final

Teams and scorers 

Scoring - Try = three (3) points - Goal = two (2) points - Drop goal = two (2) points

The road to success

Notes and comments 
1 * The John Player Yearbook 1974–75 gives the score as 8-15 (4 goals to 3 converted tries)  - The RUGBYLEAGUEproject   gives the score as 2-15
2 * The John Player Yearbook 1974–75 gives the attendance as 8,522 (HT 7-4) - The RUGBYLEAGUEproject   gives the attendance as  8,556 - Other sources including the Rothmans Yearbook of 1991-92 show it as 8,012
3 * Wilderspool was the home ground of Warrington from 1883 to the end of the 2003 Summer season when they moved into the new purpose built Halliwell Jones Stadium. Wilderspool remained as a sports/Ruugby League ground and is/was used by Woolston Rovers/Warrington Wizards junior club. 
The ground had a final capacity of 9,000 although the record attendance was set in a Challenge cup third round match on 13 March 1948 when 34,304 spectators saw Warrington lose to Wigan 10-13.

See also 
British rugby league system
1973–74 Northern Rugby Football League season
Rugby league county cups
List of defunct rugby league clubs

References

External links
Saints Heritage Society
1896–97 Northern Rugby Football Union season at wigan.rlfans.com 
Hull&Proud Fixtures & Results 1896/1897
Widnes Vikings - One team, one passion Season In Review - 1896-97
The Northern Union at warringtonwolves.org

RFL Lancashire Cup
Lancashire Cup